Abraham II may refer to:

Abraham II of Seleucia-Ctesiphon, Patriarch of the Church of the East from 837 to 850
Abraham II of Armenia, Catholicos of the Armenian Apostolic Church from 1730 to 1734
Abraham II of Jerusalem, Armenian Orthodox Patriarch of Jerusalem from 885 to 909
Abraham II of Jerusalem, Greek Orthodox Patriarch of Jerusalem from 1775 to 1787
Abraham II (Coptic archbishop of Jerusalem), Coptic Orthodox Metropolitan Archbishop of Jerusalem from 1992 to 2015

See also
 Ibrahim II (disambiguation)
 Abraham I (disambiguation)
 Abraham III (disambiguation)